Ghost Patrol is a 1936 American Western film directed by Sam Newfield.

Plot
A scientific genius has invented a machine capable of causing planes to crash. He uses it on planes loaded with valuables. Various characters become involved in conspiracies and double crosses in an attempt to stop him.

Cast
Tim McCoy as Tim Caverly
Claudia Dell as Natalie Brent
Walter Miller as Ted Dawson
Wheeler Oakman as Kincaid
James P. Burtis as Henry Brownlee
Lloyd Ingraham as Prof. Jonathan Brent
Dick Curtis as Henchie Charlie

External links

1936 films
1930s science fiction films
American black-and-white films
1936 Western (genre) films
American Western (genre) science fiction films
Films directed by Sam Newfield
1930s English-language films
1930s American films